The Attack is a 2012 French/Belgian/Qatari/Egyptian drama film directed by Ziad Doueiri.

Cast 
 Ali Suliman as Amin Jaafari
 Reymond Amsalem as Siham Jaafari
 Evgenia Dodina as Kim
 Dvir Benedek as Raveed
 Uri Gavriel as Captain Moshe
 Ruba Salameh as Faten
 Karim Saleh as Adel
 Nisrin Siksik as Leila
 Bassem Lulu as Yasser
 Ezra Dagan as Ezra Benhaim
 Ramzi Maqdisi as Priest
 Arieh Worthalter as the man

Reception

References

External links 
 
 
 
 
 

2012 drama films
2012 films
Films set in Israel
Qatari drama films
Belgian drama films
Egyptian drama films
French drama films
Films directed by Ziad Doueiri
2010s French films